Minuscule 453 (in the Gregory-Aland numbering), A πρ40 (in the Soden numbering), is a Greek minuscule manuscript of the New Testament, on a parchment. Palaeographically it has been assigned to the 14th century. 
Formerly it was labelled by 81a.

Description 

The codex contains the text of the Acts of the Apostles, Catholic epistles on 295 parchment leaves. The text is written in two columns per page, in 32 lines per page.

Text 

The Greek text of the codex is a mixture of text-types. Aland placed it in Category III.

In Acts 8:37 it has additional verse together with the manuscripts Codex Laudanius, 323, 945, 1739, 1891, 2818 (formerly 36a), and several others.

In Acts 8:39 instead of πνεῦμα κυρίου (spirit of the Lord) it has unusual textual variant  (the Holy Spirit fell on the eunuch, and an angel of the Lord caught up Philip) supported by several minuscule manuscripts: Codex Alexandrinus, 94, 103, 307, 322, 323, 385, 467, 945, 1739, 1765, 1891, 2298, 36a, itp, vg, syrh.

In Acts 20:28 it reads του κυριου — Papyrus 74, A, C*, D, E, Ψ, 33, 36, 945, 1739, 1891, instead of Alexandrian του Θεου or Byzantine του κυριου και του Θεου.

History 

The manuscript was dated by Scrivener to the 11th century. Gregory dated it to the 14th century. Currently it is dated by the INTF to the 14th century.

The manuscript was examined by Birch in some passages of the Acts (1:24; 20:26.27.28.29.32) and by Scholz in some passages of the 1 John (4:16; 5:7.20). C. R. Gregory saw it in 1886.

The manuscript was added to the list of the New Testament manuscripts by Scholz (1794-1852).
Formerly it was labelled by 81a. In 1908 Gregory gave the number 453 to it.

It is currently housed at the Vatican Library (Barb. gr. 582) in Rome.

See also 

 List of New Testament minuscules
 Biblical manuscript
 Textual criticism

References

Further reading

External links 
 Minuscule 453 at the Encyclopedia of Textual Criticism

Greek New Testament minuscules
14th-century biblical manuscripts
Manuscripts of the Vatican Library